Þuríðr Þorkilsdóttir (Faroese Turið Torkilsdóttir, Icelandic Þuríður, Norwegian Turid) sometimes anglicized as Thurid   (ca. 960-ca. 1047)  was a powerful, influential woman in the Faroe Islands during the Viking Age.

Biography
She was born at Ulfdal in Dovrefjell, Norway and died in Skúvoy.  Þuríðr was the daughter of Ragnhild Þoralfsdóttir and Þorkil Barfrost. Around 986, she married Sigmundur Brestisson on his third visit to Norway. According to the Færeyinga saga, the wedding took place at the farm of Jarl Håkon Sigurdsson near Trondheim and lasted for seven days. She had a daughter with him, Þóra. That autumn, the couple and their daughter moved to the Faroes, where  Þuríðr lived the rest of her life. Þuríðr and Sigmundr later had four sons, Þórálfr, Steingrímr, Brandr and Heri Sigmundsson, who all lived on the farm in Skúvoy. After her husband's death in 1005, she was generally called Þuríðr meginekkja, meaning powerful widow.

In popular culture
The Faroese heavy metal band Týr wrote a song with the  name Þurið Þorkilsdóttir for the album By the Light of the Northern Star.

References

10th-century Faroese people
10th-century Norwegian women
11th-century Norwegian women
Faroese people of Norwegian descent
11th-century Faroese people